Il Pomo d'Oro is a prize-winning orchestra founded in 2012 and named after the opera Il pomo d'oro by Antonio Cesti. The ensemble specialises in Historically informed performance of music from the Baroque and Classical period which it performs and records led by its own lead violinists Federico Guglielmo and Zefira Valova, or by guest conductors including Maxim Emelyanychev (chief conductor since 2016), :it:Riccardo Minasi, Stefano Montanari, George Petrou, :de:Enrico Onofri, :nl:Francesco Corti, Zefira Valova and the Stradella specialist Andrea De Carlo.

Discography
The ensemble has produced the following recordings:

2012: Concerti Per Violino V, Per Pisendel, Vivaldi
2012: Bad Guys
2012: Concerti Per Violino IV "L'imperatore", Vivaldi
2013: Arias For Caffarelli
2014: Tamerlano, Handel
2015: Arie Napoletane
2015: Partenope, Handel
2015: Catone in Utica, Vinci
2017: Carnevale 1729
2017: Ottone, Handel
2018: Serse, Handel
2020: Agrippina, Handel
2022: Handel: Apollo e Dafne & Armida abbandonata (Pentatone)

References

External links
Official homepage

Early music orchestras